Timo Lindström (born April 9, 1986) is a Finnish former professional ice hockey goaltender.

Lindström played three games in the SM-liiga, two for KalPa during the 2005–06 season and one for HPK during the 2007–08 season.

References

External links

1986 births
Asplöven HC players
Dunaújvárosi Acélbikák players
Ferencvárosi TC (ice hockey) players
Finnish ice hockey goaltenders
HPK players
LHK Jestřábi Prostějov players
KalPa players
Living people
Rovaniemen Kiekko players
Ice hockey people from Helsinki
Finnish expatriate ice hockey players in the Czech Republic
Finnish expatriate ice hockey players in Sweden
Finnish expatriate ice hockey players in Austria
Finnish expatriate ice hockey players in Hungary